Louisiana Highway 574 (LA 574) is a collection of eight current and four former state-maintained streets in Grand Isle,  located in lower Jefferson Parish.  All twelve routes were established with the 1955 Louisiana Highway renumbering.


Current routes

Louisiana Highway 574-1

Louisiana Highway 574-1 (LA 574-1) spans  from south to north along Central Avenue.  While in the Grand Isle city limits, the route is actually on Cheniere Caminada, the last part of the mainland approaching the bridge to Grand Isle.  Ending at dead ends in both directions, LA 574-1 crosses LA 1 immediately to the west of the Caminada Pass bridge.

Louisiana Highway 574-3

Louisiana Highway 574-3 (LA 574-3) spans  from south to north along Santiny Lane.  From the south, LA 574-3 begins at an intersection with LA 1 and ends at a dead end just to the north.

Louisiana Highway 574-4

Louisiana Highway 574-4 (LA 574-4) spans  from south to north along Chighizola Lane.  From the south, LA 574-4 begins at an intersection with LA 1 and ends at a dead end just to the north.

Louisiana Highway 574-5

Louisiana Highway 574-5 (LA 574-5) spans  from south to north along Ludwig Lane.  From the south, LA 574-5 begins at an intersection with LA 1 and proceeds north to Medical Avenue.

Louisiana Highway 574-6

Louisiana Highway 574-6 (LA 574-6) spans  from south to north along Naccari Lane.  From the south, LA 574-6 begins at an intersection with LA 1 and ends at a dead end just to the north.

Louisiana Highway 574-7

Louisiana Highway 574-7 (LA 574-7) spans  from south to north along Hector Lane.  From the south, LA 574-7 begins at an intersection with LA 1 and ends at a dead end just to the north.

Louisiana Highway 574-8

Louisiana Highway 574-8 (LA 574-8) spans  from south to north along Landry Lane.  From the south, LA 574-8 begins at an intersection with LA 1 and ends at a dead end just to the north.

Louisiana Highway 574-9

Louisiana Highway 574-9 (LA 574-9) spans  from south to north along Cemetery Lane.  From the south, LA 574-9 begins at an intersection with LA 1 and ends at a dead end just to the north.

Former routes

Louisiana Highway 574-2

Louisiana Highway 574-2 (LA 574-2) spanned  from south to north along Burnett Lane.  It began at the shore of the Gulf of Mexico and proceeded north to an intersection with LA 1 immediately to the southeast of the Caminada Pass bridge.

The route was deleted and returned to local control in 1987.

Louisiana Highway 574-10

Louisiana Highway 574-10 (LA 574-10) spanned  from south to north along Minnich Lane.  It began at an intersection with LA 1 and proceeded north to Louisiana Avenue.

LA 574-10 was renumbered to LA 3150 in 1972.

Louisiana Highway 574-11

Louisiana Highway 574-11 (LA 574-11) spanned  from south to north along Humble Lane.  It began at an intersection with LA 1 at the Gulf of Mexico, proceeded northeast parallel to LA 1, and ended at a second intersection with LA 1.

LA 574-11 was renumbered to LA 3151 in 1972.

Louisiana Highway 574-12

Louisiana Highway 574-12 (LA 574-12) spanned  from south to north along Admiral Craik Drive.  It began at an intersection with LA 1 and proceeded north to a dead end at Barataria Pass.

LA 574-12 has been returned to local control.

References

External links

La DOTD State, District, and Parish Maps
District 02
Jefferson Parish (South Section)

0574
Transportation in Jefferson Parish, Louisiana